The following is a list of releases on the British indie label Lojinx.  Catalog numbers begin with "LJX" followed by a three digit sequential number and format designation (e.g. CD, LP, V7, etc.), as printed on every physical release.  This list is sorted by catalog number and is mostly chronological.  The release date given is for the UK, other European release dates may vary.

References

Discographies of British record labels